Donald Eugene Hanrahan (February 6, 1929 – February 8, 2010) was a professional basketball forward who spent one season in the National Basketball Association (NBA) as a member of the Indianapolis Olympians during the 1952–53 season. He attended Loyola University of Chicago.

External links
 

1929 births
2010 deaths
Basketball players from Chicago
Forwards (basketball)
Indianapolis Olympians players
Loyola Ramblers men's basketball players
Undrafted National Basketball Association players